The Irvington Historic District in Irvington, Kentucky is a  historic district which was listed on the National Register of Historic Places in 1998.

It is roughly bounded by CSX tracks, Third, Caroline and Walnut Streets.  It included 20 contributing buildings, 12 contributing structures, and three contributing sites.  Interspersed are fourteen non-contributing buildings and a non-contributing site.  It even included a U.S. Post Office.

It was deemed significant as the "most cohesive group of early commercial buildings that formed one of Breckinridge County's most prosperous railroad towns that continues to thrive today."  Most of the buildings are one- and two-story brick structures.

References

Historic districts on the National Register of Historic Places in Kentucky
National Register of Historic Places in Breckinridge County, Kentucky
Late 19th and Early 20th Century American Movements architecture
Early Commercial architecture in the United States
Buildings and structures completed in 1888
1888 establishments in Kentucky